Kisoga is a town in Mukono District in Central Uganda.

Location
The coordinates of Kisoga are:
0°15'10.0"N, 32°49'02.0"E (Latitude:0.252778; Longitude:32.817222).

Points of interest
These are some of the points of interest in or near Kisoga:
 
 the offices of Kisoga Town Council
 Kisoga Central Market
 the Mukono–Kyetume–Katosi–Nyenga Road passes through town. At Kisoga, a southern spur measuring  runs south to Katosi on the northern shores of Lake Victoria. The road continues east for another  to the New Jinja Bridge at Njeru.

See also
 List of cities and towns in Uganda
 List of roads in Uganda

References

External links
 Manya Obubuga Bwo: Kisoga, Mukono (Video Profile of Kisoga, Mukono) in Luganda

Mukono District
Populated places in Central Region, Uganda
Cities in the Great Rift Valley